Olu Ijijen (Ogbowuru) was born to Olu Ginuwa. He is the 2nd Olu of Warri. He succeeded his father Ogiame Olu Ginuwa. He was the first King to reach Ode-Itsekiri (Big Warri) as his father settled down at Ijala community which is the burial place for all future Olu's. He reigned from 1510 to 1538. He was succeeded by his brother Olu Irame.

References

Nigerian traditional rulers
People from Warri